The Cuban Records in Swimming are the fastest times ever swum by a swimmer from Cuba. These records are kept/maintained by Cuba's national swimming federation: Federacion Cubana de Natacion (FCN). Records are recognized for the following events:
freestyle (libre): 50, 100, 200, 400, 800 and 1500;
backstroke (dorso): 50, 100 and 200;
breaststroke (pecho): 50, 100 and 200;
butterfly (mariposa): 50, 100 and 200;
individual medley (I.M.) (combinado, C.I.): 100, 200 and 400;
relays (relevos): 400 free, 800 free, and 400 medley.

Long Course (50 m)

Men

|-bgcolor=#DDDDDD
|colspan=9|
|-

|-bgcolor=#DDDDDD
|colspan=9|
|-

|-bgcolor=#DDDDDD
|colspan=9|
|-

|-bgcolor=#DDDDDD
|colspan=9|
|-

|-bgcolor=#DDDDDD
|colspan=9|
|-

Women

|-bgcolor=#DDDDDD
|colspan=9|
|-

|-bgcolor=#DDDDDD
|colspan=9|
|-

|-bgcolor=#DDDDDD
|colspan=9|
|-

|-bgcolor=#DDDDDD
|colspan=9|
|-

|-bgcolor=#DDDDDD
|colspan=9|
|-

Mixed relay

Short Course (25 m)

Men

Women

References

Cuba
Records
Swimming
Swimming